Orthotylus bureschi is a species of bug from the Miridae family that can be found in European countries such as Bulgaria and Greece.

References

Insects described in 1969
Hemiptera of Europe
bureschi